Heloïse Denner (née Jordaan) is a South African politician and attorney. She is a member of the Freedom Front Plus (FF+) and a representative of the party in the National Assembly of South Africa. In 2019, she and Tammy Wessels became the first women to represent the party in Parliament.

References

External links
Mrs Heloise Denner – Parliament of South Africa
Heloise Denner – People's Assembly

Living people
Afrikaner people
Freedom Front Plus politicians
People from the Free State (province)
People from Bloemfontein
Year of birth missing (living people)
Members of the National Assembly of South Africa